Jordanita kurdica is a moth of the family Zygaenidae. It is known from south-eastern Turkey and western Iran.

The length of the forewings is 15.5–17 mm for males and about 11.5 mm for females. Adults are on wing from June to July.

References
C. M. Naumann, W. G. Tremewan: The Western Palaearctic Zygaenidae. Apollo Books, Stenstrup 1999,

External links
Barcode of Life Data Systems (Bold)

Procridinae
Moths described in 1987
Flora of Kurdistan